Tennessee Moon is the twenty-third studio album by Neil Diamond. Released in February 1996, it is the product of a collaboration with various country music songwriters and performers. A companion television special entitled Under a Tennessee Moon was aired on ABC. The album was certified gold by the RIAA.

Track listing

Personnel
 Neil Diamond – lead vocals 
 Dennis Burnside – acoustic piano (1), organ (1)
 Alan Lindgren – organ (2, 9), acoustic piano (5, 6, 8, 9, 12), keyboards (8, 14, 15), arrangements (8, 15)
 Matt Rollings – acoustic piano (3, 7, 10, 13, 16, 17, 18), organ (4)
 Jo-El Sonnier – accordion (3)
 Al Kooper – organ (17)
 Mark Casstevens – acoustic guitar (1)
 Brent Mason – electric guitar (1, 3, 13)
 Bruce Bouton – pedal steel guitar (1, 3, 4, 10, 13, 16), lap steel guitar (7)
 Dan Dugmore – acoustic guitar (2, 5, 8, 9, 10, 12, 14, 17), pedal steel guitar (2, 5, 6, 8, 12, 14), electric guitar (6, 7, 14), electric harmonium (9)
 Gary Nicholson – acoustic guitar (2)
 Doug Rhone – acoustic guitar (2, 5, 6, 9, 12, 14, 15), electric guitar (9, 17)
 Richard Bennett – acoustic guitar (3-6, 8, 11, 13, 15, 16, 18), electric guitar (3, 4, 7, 10, 12, 17), guitarophone (3, 8)
 Hal Ketchum – acoustic guitar (3), backing vocals (3)
 Steve Gibson – acoustic guitar (4, 13, 16, 18)
 Chris Leuzinger – electric guitar (4)
 Brent Rowan – electric guitar (4, 16, 18)
 Biff Watson – acoustic guitar (7, 10, 17)
 Paul Worley – acoustic guitar (7)
 Dann Huff – electric guitar (13)
 Gary Burr – acoustic guitar (14), backing vocals (14)
 Chet Atkins – acoustic guitar (18), backing vocals (8)
 Rob Hajacos – fiddle (1, 4, 9, 16, 18), "hoedown" instruments (1)
 Jonathan Yudkin – fiddle (3, 13)
 Andrea Zonn – fiddle (5, 10, 14)
 Tammy Rogers – fiddle (6, 17)
 Sam Bush – fiddle (7), mandolin (7)
 Mark O'Connor – fiddle (15)
 Michael Rhodes – bass (1, 4, 7, 10, 17)
 Reinie Press – bass (2, 5, 6, 9, 11, 12, 14, 15)
 David Hungate – bass (3, 13, 16), electric upright bass (18)
 Dave Pomeroy – fretless bass (8)
 Lonnie Wilson – drums (1), percussion (1)
 Ron Tutt – drums (2, 5, 6, 9, 11, 12, 14, 15)
 Paul Leim – drums (3, 4, 13, 16, 18)
 Chester Thompson – drums (7, 10, 17)
 Sam Bacco – percussion (3-7, 9, 10, 12, 13, 14, 16, 17, 18)
 Bergen White – arrangements (5, 10)
 The Nashville String Machine – strings
 John Wesley Ryles – backing vocals (1, 4, 7, 9)
 Dennis Wilson – backing vocals (1, 7)
 Waylon Jennings – lead vocals (2)
 Jana King – backing vocals (3, 13, 15, 16, 18)
 Curtis Wright – backing vocals (3, 13, 15, 16, 18)
 Curtis Young – backing vocals (3, 13, 15, 16, 18)
 Stephanie Bentley – backing vocals (4)
 Buffy Lawson – lead vocals (5), backing vocals (7, 10)
 Beth Nielsen Chapman – lead vocals (6)
 Debra Black – backing vocals (7, 10)
 Harry Stinson – backing vocals (7)
 Rosemary Butler – lead vocals (8)
 Bill LaBounty – backing vocals (9)
 Kathy Burdick – backing vocals (9)
 Melodie Crittenden – backing vocals (11)
 Bob Gaudio – backing vocals (11), accordion (17)
 Raul Malo – lead vocals (12)
 Beth Hooker – backing vocals (14)

Production
 Don Cook – producer (1)
 Bob Gaudio – producer (2, 4-12, 14-18), executive producer 
 Richard Landis – producer (3, 13)
 James Stroud – producer (3, 13)
 Paul Worley – producer (7, 8)
 Mike Bradley – engineer (1), mixing (1)
 Bernie Becker – engineer (2, 5, 6, 8, 9, 11, 12, 14, 15)
 Justin Niebank – mixing (2, 4-12, 14-18), engineer (3, 4, 7, 10, 13, 16, 17, 18)
 Chris Lord-Alge – mixing (3, 13)
 Mark Capps – assistant engineer, mix assistant 
 Chris Davie – assistant engineer, mix assistant 
 Eric Elwell – assistant engineer
 David Hall – assistant engineer
 Joe Hayden – assistant engineer
 Sandy Jenkins – assistant engineer
 Greg Parker – assistant engineer
 Mike Psanos – assistant engineer
 Mark Ralston – assistant engineer
 Rhett Travis – assistant engineer
 King Williams – assistant engineer
 Mark Hagan – mix assistant 
 Gavin Lurssen – mastering 
 Doug Sax – mastering 
 David Kirschner – art direction 
 Gabrielle Raumberger – design 
 Dylan Tran – design
 Jeff Dunas – front cover photography 
 Ed Rode – back cover photography

Studios 
 Recorded at Dark Horse Recording Studio and The Castle (Franklin, Tennessee); Javelina Recording Studios and Soundshop 'A' Inc. (Nashville, Tennessee).
 Mixed at Masterfonics, Loud Recording and Soundshop 'A' Inc. (Nashville, Tennessee).
 Mastered at The Mastering Lab (Hollywood, California).

Charts

Weekly charts

Year-end charts

Certifications

References

Neil Diamond albums
1996 albums
Columbia Records albums
Albums produced by Bob Gaudio
Albums produced by Paul Worley
Albums produced by Don Cook
Albums produced by Richard Landis
Albums produced by James Stroud